Wright an occupational surname originating in England, meaning worker or shaper of wood.  

Wright or Wrights may also refer to:

Places

Earth
Australia
 Wright, Australian Capital Territory
 Division of Wright, federal electoral division in Queensland
 Electoral district of Wright, state electoral district in South Australia
 Wright railway station, Melbourne
 Wright Rock, Tasmanian island in northern Bass Strait

Canada
 Wright, Quebec
 Mont Wright (Quebec), mountain near Fermont, Quebec

United States
 Wright, Florida
 Wright, Iowa
 Wright, Kansas
 Wright, Minnesota
 Wright, New York
 Wright, West Virginia
 Wright, Wyoming
 Wright City, Missouri
 Wright City, Oklahoma
 Wright County (disambiguation), several counties
 Wright Township (disambiguation), several townships

Solar System
 1747 Wright, asteroid
 Wright (lunar crater), Moon
 Wright (Martian crater), Mars

Art, entertainment, and media
Pastor Leon Wright, a fictional character in The Returned (U.S. TV series)
Phoenix Wright: Ace Attorney, a game with the name of the titular character for the Game Boy Advance

Brands, enterprises and organizations
Wright Aeronautical, an American aircraft and aircraft engine manufacturer
Wright Company, the Wright brothers' initial aviation business
Wright Electric, an American company developing an electric airliner
Wright State University, located in Dayton, Ohio
 Wilbur Wright College, a community college in Chicago 
 Wright's Coal Tar Soap, a popular brand of antiseptic soap
Wrightbus, an Irish bus body manufacturer
Wrights (textile manufacturers)

Other uses
Wright (ADL), a software architecture description language developed by Carnegie Mellon University
 Homer Wright rosettes, a clinical sign of certain types of cancer
USS Wright, the name of two ships of the United States Navy
 Millwright, an industrial mechanic

See also

 The Wrights (disambiguation)
 Justice Wright (disambiguation)
 Wright Field (disambiguation)
 Wright brothers (disambiguation)
 
 
 Right (disambiguation)
 Rite (disambiguation)
 Wight (disambiguation)
 Write (disambiguation)
 Wrought (disambiguation)